R Gopalakrishnan  (born 5 October 1968) is an Indian politician and Member of Parliament elected from Tamil Nadu. He was elected to the Lok Sabha from Madurai constituency as an Anna Dravida Munnetra Kazhagam candidate in 2014 election.

Gopalakrishnan was born on 5 October 1968 in Sellur, Madurai, Tamil Nadu. He was educated at Yadava College in Madurai. He is married to Smt. G. Deepa and has two children.

Gopalakrishnan was Deputy Mayor of Madurai Corporation since 2011 to 2014.

References 

All India Anna Dravida Munnetra Kazhagam politicians
Living people
India MPs 2014–2019
Lok Sabha members from Tamil Nadu
1953 births
People from Madurai district
Politicians from Madurai